Mount Auburn Cemetery is a historic, "garden-style" burial ground in Boston, Massachusetts, located between Cambridge and Watertown, and dedicated in 1831. The 174-acre grounds has long been the preferred burial ground for the middle class and elite of New England.

This list highlights its notable internees, though many others are contained within the large and scenic grounds.

There is an important instance in which burial at Mt, Auburn was proposed, but did not happen: the abolitionist John Brown, executed by Virginia in 1859. His friend Wendell Phillips, meeting the funeral party in Troy, New York, hoped to take the body to Boston for burial in Mount Auburn Cemetery, as Charles Turner Torrey had been. An impromptu announcement said this was not going to happen, since Brown had wanted to be buried at his farm in North Elba, New York. Phillips, speaking at the funeral, "intimated that Massachusetts would yet possess the remains of John Brown." 

In the 2nd half of the 19th century, The Ladies' Repository magazine published a series of brief articles on "The Distinguished Dead of Mt. Auburn", six in 1870.

.

A 
 Hannah Adams (1755–1831), author
 Elizabeth Cary Agassiz (1822–1907), scientist, author
 Louis Agassiz (1807–1873), scientist
 Thomas Bailey Aldrich (1836–1907), author
 George Thorndike Angell (1823–1909), advocate for the humane treatment of animals, founder of the Massachusetts Society for the Prevention of Cruelty to Animals
 Nathan Appleton (1779–1861), congressman
 William Appleton (1786–1862), congressman
 Thomas F. August (1926–2005), attorney and politician who served as the 31st Mayor of Somerville, Massachusetts

B 
 Hosea Ballou (1771–1852), Universalist theologian and minister
 Stanisław Barańczak (1946–2014), Polish poet and translator
 John Bartlett (1820–1905), Writer and publisher of Bartlett's Familiar Quotations
 Benjamin E. Bates (1808–1878), industrialist, benefactor of Bates College
 Jonathan Bayliss (1926–2009), Gloucester (Mass.) novelist and playwright
 Jeremy Belknap (1744–1798), clergyman and historian
 Jacob Bigelow (1787–1879), designer of Mt. Auburn Cemetery
 J. W. Black (1825–1896), photographer
 Edwin Booth (1833–1893), actor
 Edwin Boring (1886–1968), psychologist
 Nathaniel Bowditch (1773–1838), mathematician, seaman, author; his monument was the first life size bronze to be cast in America
 Ada Chastina Bowles (1836–1928), Universalist minister.
 William Brewster (1851–1919), ornithologist
 Peter Bent Brigham (1807–1877), Boston businessman and philanthropist
 Phillips Brooks (1835–1893), American Episcopal bishop
 Roger Brown (1925–1997), American social psychologist, buried together with his partner Albert Gilman
 Charles Bulfinch (1763–1844), architect
 McGeorge Bundy (1919–1996), presidential cabinet official
 Anson Burlingame (1820–1870), lawyer, legislator, diplomat

C 
 George Cabot (1752–1823), statesman
 James Henry Carleton (1814–1873), United States Army officer
 William Ellery Channing (1780–1842), Unitarian theologian
 Stanley Cavell (1926–2018), philosopher
 Joyce Chen (1917–1994), chef
 Rufus Choate (1799–1859), lawyer, Massachusetts legislator and U.S. Senator 
 John Ciardi (1916–1986), poet, translator
 Alvan Clark (1804–1887), astronomer and telescope maker
 John M. Clark (1821–1902), sheriff of Suffolk County
 Nancy Talbot Clark (1825–1901), female physician
 James B. Conant (1893–1978), president of Harvard University
 Sherman Conant (1839–1890), Union major and 9th Florida Attorney General
 Richard David Cowan (1909–1939), buried together with his partner Stewart Mitchell, intimate of Gerald and Sara Murphy
 Christopher Pearse Cranch (1813–1892)), Transcendentalist writer and artist
 Robert Creeley (1926–2005), poet
 Benjamin Williams Crowninshield (1772–1851), statesman, U.S. Secretary of the Navy
 Frank Crowninshield (1872–1947), creator and editor of Vanity Fair magazine
 Benjamin Robbins Curtis (1809–1874), United States Supreme Court justice
 Charlotte Cushman (1816–1876), actress

D 
 Felix Octavius Carr Darley (1821–1888), artist
 Frederick B. Deknatel (1905–1973), art historian
 Charles Devens (1820–1891), jurist and Union general
 Samuel Dexter (1761–1816), congressman
 Dorothea Dix (1802–1887), nurse, hospital reformer
 George Dorr (1853–1944), preservationist, founder of today's Acadia National Park
 Mildred Dresselhaus (1930–2017), physicist
 Julia Knowlton Dyer (1829-1907), philanthropist

E 

 Mary Baker Eddy (1821–1910), religious leader
 Harold "Doc" Edgerton (1903–1990), engineer, scientist
 Charles William Eliot (1834–1926), Harvard University president
 Martha May Eliot (1891–1978), foremost pediatrician and specialist in public health
 Edward Everett (1794–1865), Governor of Massachusetts, President of Harvard University, United States Secretary of State, speaker at the dedication of the Soldiers' National Cemetery in Gettysburg, Pennsylvania.
 William Everett (1839–1910), congressman

F 
 Nina Fagnani (1856–1928), American-born French painter of portrait miniatures
 Achilles Fang (1910–1995), sinologist, comparatist, and friend of Ezra Pound
 Fannie Farmer (1857–1915), cookbook author

 Fanny Fern (1811–1872), feminist author
 Annie Adams Fields (1834–1915), author and hostess; wife of James Thomas Fields
 James T. Fields (1817–1881), writer and publisher
 William M. Folger (1844–1928), United States Navy rear admiral and grandson of Mayhew Folger
 George L. Fox (1825–1877), comedian
 Felix Frankfurter (1882–1965), United States Supreme Court Justice
 Buckminster Fuller (1895–1983), architect
 Margaret Fuller (1810–1850), writer, critic, and women's rights advocate; her body was lost in a shipwreck but a monument was erected to her memory in the Fuller family plot

G 
 Isabella Stewart Gardner (1840–1924), art collector, museum founder
 Charles Dana Gibson (1867–1944), illustrator
 Charles Hammond Gibson Jr (1874–1954), philanthropist and art collector
 Albert Gilman (d. 1989), Shakespeare scholar and professor of English at Boston University, buried together with his partner Roger Brown
 Archibald R. Giroux (1897–1968), president of the Boston Stock Exchange and chairman of the Massachusetts Republican Party
 Augustus Addison Gould (1805–1866), conchologist and malacologist
 Curt Gowdy (1919–2006), sportscaster
 Asa Gray (1810–1888), 19th century American botanist
 Horace Gray (1828–1902), United States Supreme Court justice
 James Monroe Gregory (1849–1915), Howard University Dean
 Ludlow Griscom (1890–1959), field ornithologist
 Horatio Greenough (1805–1852), sculptor

H 
 Charles Hale (1831–1882), journalist, statesman
 Mary Whitwell Hale (1810–1862), teacher hymnwriter
 Edward Needles Hallowell (1836–1871), Union Army officer
 George W. Hammond (1833–1908), businessman
 Charles Hayden (1870–1937), financier and philanthropist
 George Stillman Hillard (1808–1879), author, lawyer, legislator
 Oliver Wendell Holmes, Sr. (1809–1894), physician/author
 Winslow Homer (1836–1910), artist
 Harriet Hosmer (1830–1908), first female professional sculptor
 Albion P. Howe (1818–1897), Union army general
 George Howe (1886–1955), architect
 Julia Ward Howe (1819–1910), activist, poet, and author of "Battle Hymn of the Republic" 
 Samuel Gridley Howe (1801–1876), physician, abolitionist, and advocate of education for the blind
 Horatio Hollis Hunnewell (1810–1902), banker, railroad financier, philanthropist, amateur botanist
 Harriot Kezia Hunt (1805–1875), early female physician; her monument, a statue of Hygieia, was carved by Edmonia Lewis

J 
 Harriet Ann Jacobs (1813–1897), escaped slave and author of Incidents in the Life of a Slave Girl
 Melvin Johnson (1909–1965), lawyer, Marine officer, and firearms designer
 Edward F. Jones (1828–1913), New York lieutenant governor 1886–1891

K 
 Michael Kelly (1957–2003), journalist, writer, columnist, and editor
 Edward Kent (1802–1877), governor of Maine
György Kepes (1906-2001), painter, photographer, designer, educator, and art theorist
Juliet Kepes (1919-1999), illustrator, painter and sculptor

L 
 Edwin H. Land (1909–1991), scientistand inventor of the Polaroid Land Camera
 Christopher Columbus Langdell (1826–1906), legal educator
 Abbott Lawrence (1792–1855), politician, philanthropist
 Missy LeHand (1896–1944), private secretary to Franklin Roosevelt
 Henry Cabot Lodge (1850–1924), politician
 Henry Cabot Lodge, Jr. (1902–1985), politician
 Henry Wadsworth Longfellow (1807–1882), poet
 Katharine Peabody Loring (1849–1943), educator and long-time companion of Alice James
 A. Lawrence Lowell (1856–1943), Harvard University president
 Amy Lowell (1874–1925), poet
 Charles Russell Lowell (1835–1864), Civil War general and casualty of the Battle of Cedar Creek
 Francis Cabot Lowell (1855–1911), U.S. congressman and Federal judge
 James Russell Lowell (1819–1891), poet and foreign diplomat
 Josephine Shaw Lowell (1843–1905), wife of Gen. Charles Russell Lowell, sister of Col. Robert Gould Shaw
 Maria White Lowell (1821–1853), poet and wife of James Russell Lowell

M 
 Tom Magliozzi (1935–2014), auto mechanic and radio personality
 Bernard Malamud (1914–1986), writer
 Abby Adeline Manning (1836–1906), artist, buried together with her companion, Anne Whitney
 Jules Marcou (1824–1898), geologist
 Brian G. Marsden (1937–2010), astronomer
 Abraham Maslow (1908–1970), psychologist who created Maslow's hierarchy of needs
 Augustus P. Martin (1835–1902), American politician and Union artillerist during the Civil War
 Isaac McLellan (1806–1899), author and poet
 William McMasters (1874–1968), journalist and publicist who exposed Charles Ponzi as a fraudster
 Susan Minns (1839—1938), American biologist, philanthropist, and collector
 Stewart Mitchell (1892–1957), American poet, editor, and professor of English literature, buried together with his partner, Richard David Cowan
 Franklin B. Morse (1873–1929), football player and journalist
 Leopold Morse (1831–1893), United States House of Representatives (five terms)
 William T.G. Morton (1819–1868), demonstrator of ether anesthesia & his son William J. Morton, a noted doctor
 Stephen P. Mugar (1901–1982), Armenian-American philanthropist and founder of the Star Market chain of supermarkets; father of David Mugar
 Harvey M. Munsell (1843–1913, American Union soldier, recipient of the Medal of Honor
 Joseph B. Murdock (1851–1931), United States Navy rear admiral who served as commander-in-chief of the United States Asiatic Fleet and as a member of the New Hampshire House of Representatives
 John Murray (1741–1815), founder of the Universalist Church in America

N 
 Shahan Natalie (1884–1983), principal organizer of Operation Nemesis, Armenian national philosophy writer
 Rose Standish Nichols (1872–1960), landscape architect
 Charles Eliot Norton (1827–1908), scholar and author
 Richard Norton (1872–1918), professor of archaeology, organizer of the American Volunteer Motor Ambulance Corps
 Elliot Norton (1903–2003), Boston theater critic
 Robert Nozick (1938–2002), philosopher

O 
 Richard Olney (1835–1917), statesman
 Joseph Wallace Oman (1864–1941), admiral and governor of US Virgin Islands
 Frances Sargent Osgood (1811–1850), poet
 Harrison Gray Otis (1765–1848), U.S. representative, mayor of Boston
 Laurence R. Owen (1944–1961), U.S. ladies skating champion
 Maribel Y. Owen (1940–1961), U.S. pairs figure skating champion

P 
 Thomas Fyshe Palmer (1747–1802), English Unitarian minister, political reformer and convict
 Daniel Pinckney Parker (1781–1850), merchant
 Harvey D. Parker (1805–1884), hotelier
 Francis Parkman (1823–1893), historian
 Fanny Parnell (1844–1882), poet, Irish Nationalist, and the sister of Charles Stewart Parnell
 Charles Pickering (naturalist) (1805–1878), naturalist/race scientist
 Benjamin Pitman (Hawaii judge) (1815 – January 17, 1888), American businessman who married Hawaiian nobility
 Henry Hoʻolulu Pitman (1845 – 1863) eldest son of Benjamin Pitman and Kinoʻoleoliliha, a Hawaiian high chiefess, Union Soldier of Native Hawaiian descent
 Eleanor H. Porter (1868–1920), novelist

Q 
 Josiah Quincy III (1772–1864), statesman and educator

R 
 John Rawls (1921–2002), philosopher
 Anne Revere (1903–1990), actress
 George Lewis Ruffin (1834–1886), first African-American judge in the United States
 Josephine St. Pierre Ruffin (1842–1924), suffragist, publisher of Women's Era
 William Eustis Russell (1857–1896), governor of Massachusetts

S 
 Paul A. Samuelson (1915–2009), economist, Nobel Prize winner
 Arthur M. Schlesinger Jr. (1917–2007), historian, presidential speechwriter, public intellectual
 Julian Seymour Schwinger (1918–1994), theoretical physicist, Nobel Prize winner
 Lemuel Shaw (1781–1861), chief justice of the Massachusetts Supreme Judicial Court
 Claude Shannon (1916–2001), mathematician, electrical engineer, cryptographer
 B. F. Skinner (1904–1990), psychologist
 Charles Lewis Slattery (1867–1930), bishop, author
 Henry Davis Sleeper (1878–1934), interior designer
 Franklin W. Smith (1826–1911), promoter of historical architecture
 Johann Gaspar Spurzheim (1776–1832), phrenologist
 Daniel C. Stillson (1830–1899), inventor of the Stillson pipe wrench
 I. F. Stone (1907–1989), journalist
 Joseph Story (1779–1845), United States Supreme Court Justice
 Gerry Studds (1937–2006), United States House of Representatives
 Charles Sumner (1811–1874), U.S. Senator

T 
 Frank William Taussig (1859–1940), economist
 Randall Thompson (1899–1984), composer
 William Ticknor (1810–1864), publisher and the founder of the publishing house Ticknor and Fields
 William Davis Ticknor, Sr. (1881–1938), president and chairman of the board of Commercial Solvents Corporation and president of Commercial Pigments Corporation
 Frederic W. Tilton (1839–1918), American educator and 7th Principal of Phillips Academy in Andover, Massachusetts
 William S. Tilton (1828–1889), Civil War brigade commander
 Charles Turner Torrey (1813–1846), American abolitionist
 George Makepeace Towle (1841–1893), lawyer, politician, author
 Charles Tufts (1781–1876), businessman who donated the land for Tufts University

V 
 Maribel Vinson (1911–1961), nine-time U.S. skating champion and coach

W 
 Charles F. Walcott (1838–1887), Union Army colonel and brevet brigadier general
 Benjamin Waterhouse (1754–1846), physician
 Norman H. White (1871–1951), publisher and politician
 Anne Whitney (1821–1915), sculptor, buried together with her companion, Abby Adeline Manning.
 Nathaniel Parker Willis (1806–1867), publisher, editor, author, poet
 Joseph Winlock (1826–1875), astronomer
 Robert Charles Winthrop (1809–1894), statesman
 Roger Wolcott (1847–1900), governor of Massachusetts
 Joseph Emerson Worcester (1784–1865), lexicographer

Y 
 Joshua Young (1823–1904), Unitarian minister, active abolitionist

References 

Burials at Mount Auburn Cemetery
Mount Auburn Cemetery